Péter Andorai (25 April 1948 – 1 February 2020) was a Hungarian actor. He appeared in more than 90 films since 1975. He starred in the 1980 film Bizalom, which was entered into the 30th Berlin International Film Festival, where it won the Silver Bear for Best Director.

Selected filmography

 Vörös rekviem (1976) - Sallai Imre
 A kard (1977) - Feri
 Ékezet (1977) - Seregi, üzemmérnök
 Riasztólövés (1977) - Csipesz
 My Father's Happy Years (1977) - Varga Ernõ, kommunista
 Amerikai cigaretta (1978) - Jegyüzér
 Áramütés (1979) - Vince
 Szabadíts meg a gonosztól (1979) - Antal, a katona
 Bizalom (1980) - János Biró
 The Green Bird (1980) - Jan Widuchowski
 Utolsó elötti ítélet (1980) - A férfi
 Mephisto (1981) - Otto Ulrichs
 Another Way (1982) - Dönci Horváth - Lívia férje
 Nyom nélkül (1982) - Gyanusított
 Tight Quarters (1983) - Miklós
 Szeretök (1984) - Árkosi
 Eszmélés (1984) - Tányér Imre
 Colonel Redl (1985) - Major aus Wien
 Lélegzetvisszafojtva (1985)
 Falfúró (1986) - Gondnok
 Elsö kétszáz évem (1986) - Betörõ
 Képvadászok (1986) - Gál
 A nagy generáció (1986)
 Hajnali háztetök (1986) - Halász Péter
 Love, Mother (1987) - Csépai elvtárs
 Érzékeny búcsú a fejedelemtöl (1987) - Kemény János
 Küldetés Evianba (1988) - Náci összekötõ
 Hanussen (1988) - Fabian
 Kiáltás és kiáltás (1988) - Tibor
 Eldorádó (1988) - Berci
 Egy teljes nap (1988) - A vak utas
 Before the Bat's Flight Is Done (1989)
 Vadon (1989)
 Die Skorpionfrau (1989) - Felix
 The Pregnant Papa (1989) - Béla, az orvos
 My 20th Century (1989) - Thomas Edison
 Georg Elser - Einer aus Deutschland (1989) - Leibl
 A hecc (1989) - György, Tamás bátyja
 Könnyü vér (1990) - Férfi a hajón
 Magyar rekviem (1990) - Rusznyák
 Itt a szabadság! (1991) - Kopa Imre
 A három növér (1991) - Versinyin
 Szerelmes szívek (1991) - Király, a menedzser
 Könyörtelen idök (1992) - Berkovich szolgabíró
 Sweet Emma, Dear Böbe (1992) - Stefanics - Igazgató
 A csalás gyönyöre (1992) - Feri - Jutka férje
 Goldberg variácók (1992)
 Roncsfilm (1992) - Ádám
 Gyerekgyilkosságok (1993) - Andró Béla, nyomozó
 Vigyázók (1993) - Károly, Éva testvére
 Rúzs (1994) - Arpad
 Utrius (1994)
 Váratlan halál (1996) - (segment "Az ablakok-Levél")
 Csinibaba (1997) - Kúnó Purábl
 The Witman Boys (1997) - Endre Tálay
 Presszó (1998) - Nyomozó
 Simon, the Magician (1999) - Simon
 Sunshine (1999) - Anselmi
 Rosszfiúk (2000) - Kecsõ apja
 Hamvadó cigarettavég (2001) - German general
 Rinaldó (2003) - Lajos
 A Rózsa énekei (2003)
 Bolondok éneke (2003) - Dominik
 The Unburied Man (2004) - Münnich Ferenc
 Rózsadomb (2004) - Gábor
 Relatives (2006) - Szentkálnay
 Lopott képek (2006) - Ottó
 Töredék (2007)
 A Nap utcai fiúk (2007) - Gábor apja
 Az ügynökök a paradicsomba mennek (2010) - Kárász Andor
 The Door (2012) - Mr. Brodarics
 The Notebook (2013) - Plébános
 Pillangók (2014) - Motil
 Argo 2 (2015)
 Aurora Borealis: Északi fény (2017) - ÁVH soldier II.
 A hentes, a kurva és a félszemü (2017) - Kaszala ezrdes
 Zárójelentés (2020) - Oregember az állomáson

Honors and awards
 Jászai Mari Award (1980)
 Hungarian Movie Week Award (1986,1999)
 Award of The Hungarian Movie Critics (1987,2000)
 Veszprém TV get-together Special Award (1990)
 Hungarian TV Critics Award (1991)
 Kossuth Prize (1994)
 Order of Merit of the Republic of Hungary, Officer's Cross (2007)
 The Nation's Performer (2015)
 Prima Award (2016)

References

External links

1948 births
2020 deaths
Hungarian male film actors
Male actors from Budapest
20th-century Hungarian male actors
Hungarian male television actors